The 2015 Team Speedway Junior European Championship was the eighth Team Speedway Junior European Championship season. It was organised by the Fédération Internationale de Motocyclisme and was the fourth as an under 21 years of age event.

The final took place on 12 September 2015 in Plzeň, Czech Republic. The defending champions Poland won the final once again to record their fourth consecutive title win but were pushed all the way by Sweden, who finished just one point behind.

Results

Final
  Plzeň
 12 September 2015

See also 
 2015 Team Speedway Junior World Championship
 2015 Individual Speedway Junior European Championship

References 

2015
European Team Junior